The apellaia were the offerings made at the initiation of a young man (kouros) at a meeting of a family-group ( phratria) of the northwest Greeks. Apellaios is the month of these rites and offerings, and Apellon (Doric form of Apollo),  is the megistos kouros ("The great Kouros").

The brotherhood, the phratry, controlled the access to civic rights. There was a three-day family-festival, with initiation ceremonies, not concerning the state. The father introduced his young child, then again as a child (ephebos) who would become a grown-up kouros, and the husband his wife after the marriage. The three-day festival of the northwest Greeks was called Apellai, and was similar with the Ionic Apaturia.  The three relative offerings of Apellai at least in Delphi were paideia (for child), apellaia (youth), and gamela (marriage; gamos in Greek).

According to Plutarch: "It was a custom for those who from children were initiated to grown-up kouroi, to go to Delphi and offer there the hair of their head to the god (Apollo). Theseus went there, and he only shaved the forepart of his head." "Apollo is the unshorn Phoibos." A similar offering was made in the Apaturia, which was called koureion (from κείρω keiro, "cut, esp. hair"). and corresponds to apellaion

See also
Apella
Apellai

Notes

Rites of passage
Ancient Greek culture